Noble Atkins was a college football and basketball player. He was a prominent center for the TCU Horned Frogs football team of Texas Christian. Atkins was selected All-Southern in 1929 by football fans of the south through Central Press newspapers. He weighed some 215 pounds during the football season, and managed 187 while playing basketball. He weighed around 200 when he played baseball. He signed with the Green Bay Packers in 1933.

References

All-Southern college football players
American football centers
Players of American football from Texas
TCU Horned Frogs football players
TCU Horned Frogs men's basketball players
TCU Horned Frogs baseball players
American men's basketball players